The Little Liakhvi ( Patara Liakhvi) is a river of Georgia. It is a left tributary of the Great Liakhvi, which it joins near the village Shindisi.

References

Rivers of Georgia (country)